Rakhee Tandon may refer to:

Rakhee Tandon (actress), Indian actress active 1996–present
Rakhee Kapoor Tandon (born 1986), Indian businesswoman